Jason Ferus Blum (born 20 February 1969) is an American film and television producer. He is the founder and CEO of Blumhouse Productions, which produced the horror franchises Paranormal Activity (2007–2021), Insidious (2010–2023), and The Purge (2013–2021). Blum also produced Sinister (2012), Oculus (2013), Whiplash (2014), The Gift (2015), Hush (2016), Split (2016), Ouija: Origin of Evil (2016), Get Out (2017), Happy Death Day  (2017), Upgrade (2018), Halloween (2018), Us (2019), The Invisible Man (2020), Freaky (2020), The Black Phone (2021) and M3GAN (2022).

Blum received nominations for the Academy Award for Best Picture for producing Whiplash (2014), Get Out (2017), and BlacKkKlansman (2018). He received the Primetime Emmy Award for Outstanding Television Movie for producing the drama film The Normal Heart (2014). He also won the Primetime Emmy Award for Outstanding Documentary or Nonfiction Series for the documentary miniseries The Jinx (2015).

Early life and education
Blum was born in Los Angeles, California, the son of Shirley Neilsen Blum (née Neilsen) and Irving Blum. His mother was an art professor and his father was an independent art dealer and director of the Ferus Gallery. Blum is of Jewish heritage.

He graduated from Vassar College in 1991. While at Vassar, he and fellow future filmmaker, Noah Baumbach, were roommates, and Blum produced Baumbach's first film, Kicking and Screaming in 1995.

Career 
Blum worked for Bob and Harvey Weinstein as an executive at Miramax, and later as an independent producer for Paramount Pictures. Prior to his tenure at Miramax, Blum was a producing director at Ethan Hawke's Malaparte theater company. Blum is a 1991 graduate of Vassar College. He is a member of the board of trustees of the Academy Museum of Motion Pictures.

He obtained financing for his first film as producer, Kicking and Screaming (1995), after receiving a letter from family acquaintance, entertainer Steve Martin, who endorsed the script. Blum attached the letter to copies of the script he sent around to Hollywood executives.

Blumhouse Productions 
In 2000, he founded Blumhouse Productions, which specializes in producing micro-budget movies that give directors full creative control over the projects. Bloomberg News praised Blum for making "blockbusters for pennies", including the horror film Paranormal Activity which cost $15,000 to make and then grossed nearly $200 million. In addition, NPR's Planet Money did a special podcast about the company's methods.

Blum also produced Insidious (2010), Sinister (2012), The Purge (2013), and Happy Death Day (2017), as well as their sequels. In 2014, he served as executive producer for the television film The Normal Heart, which went on to win the Primetime Emmy Award for Outstanding Television Movie. In 2015, he won an Emmy Award for Outstanding Documentary or Nonfiction Series for HBO's The Jinx.

Blum's feature films BlacKkKlansman, Whiplash and Get Out were all nominated for the Academy Award for Best Picture.

In 2018, Blum said in an interview that the reason no woman had ever directed one of his horror films was that "there are not a lot of female directors (...) and even less who are inclined to do horror." After much criticism on social media, in which lists of such directors were circulated, he apologized for what he called his "dumb comments". In 2019, Sophia Takal directed and co-wrote the studio's horror remake Black Christmas, which opened on December 13, and was the studio's first (and only) theatrically-released film by a female director.

Other ventures
On August 14, 2020, Daily Front Row listed Blum as one of a group of high-profile investors who purchased W magazine, a troubled fashion magazine.

Personal life 
On July 14, 2012, Blum married journalist Lauren A.E. Schuker in Los Angeles.

In July 2019, he bought a Brooklyn Heights townhouse for $9.8 million.

Boards 
Blum is on the Board of The Public Theater in New York, the Sundance Institute, Vassar College, and the Academy Museum of Motion Pictures.

Philanthropy 
Recently, Blum donated $10M to Vassar College, the largest gift ever given to the college from a male alumnus.

Filmography

Film

Universal Pictures

Paramount Pictures

Lionsgate Films

Focus Features

Sony Pictures Releasing

Netflix

Amazon Studios

FilmDistrict

The Weinsteins

Other

Television

Awards and nominations

References

External links

 
 
 Interview with Blum (2013)

1969 births
American film producers
American people of Jewish descent
Businesspeople from Los Angeles
Businesspeople from New York City
Film producers from California
Film producers from New York (state)
Independent Spirit Award winners
Living people
Primetime Emmy Award winners
Vassar College alumni
Taft School alumni